Namassa is a village in the Bourzanga Department of Bam Province in northern Burkina Faso. It has a population of 233.

References

External links
Satellite map at Maplandia.com

Populated places in the Centre-Nord Region
Bam Province